Theodor Hörmann von Hörbach (13 December 1840, in Imst – 1 July 1895, in Graz) was an Austrian landscape painter.

Biography 
He began his career in the Austrian Army and served during the Second Italian War of Independence (known as the Sardinian War in Austria), followed by service in the Austro-Prussian War. He reached the rank of Oberleutnant.

From 1873 to 1875, he studied at the Academy of Fine Arts, Vienna, with Eduard Peithner von Lichtenfels and Anselm Feuerbach. After that, he taught drawing and fencing at the Military Realschule in Sankt Pölten.

In 1884, he got married and retired from military service. He undertook several study trips and lived in Paris from 1886 to 1890, where he came under the influence of Impressionism. From 1890 to 1893, he lived in Znaim, then settled in Vienna, becoming a member of the Künstlerhaus.

He died in Graz while returning from a trip to Italy and was buried in the Vienna Central Cemetery.

References

Further reading 
 Hörmann-Ausstellung. Werke aus dem Nachlasse des Künstlers, Catalog of the Genossenschaft der bildenden Künstler Wiens, Vienna 1895
 Theo Braunegger: Theodor von Hörmann 1840–1895. Österreichischer Landschaftsmaler. Phil. Diss., University of Innsbruck 1970  
 Theo Braunegger/Magdalena Hörmann-Weingartner: Theodor von Hörmann 1840–1895, Editions Tusch, 1979  
 Theodor von Hörmann 1840–1895, Catalog, Tiroler Landesmuseum Ferdinandeum, Innsbruck 1995 
 Marianne Hussl-Hörmann: Theodor von Hörmann (1840–1895).  Monographie mit Verzeichnis der Gemälde, with contributions by Mathias Boeckl, Manfried Rauchensteiner and Marianne Rauchensteiner, Im Kinsky Editions, 2013

External links 

 
 
 
 ArtNet: More works by Von Hörmann. 
 Theodor von Hörmann website, Biography, references and works

1840 births
1895 deaths
19th-century Austrian painters
19th-century Austrian male artists
Austrian landscape painters
Austrian male painters
People from Imst District